Ismail Jilaoui is a French born Moroccan Dressage rider. He competed at the 2018 FEI World Equestrian Games in Tryon, North Carolina and has qualified as individual rider for the 2020 Summer Olympics in Tokyo, Japan.

References 

Living people
1978 births
Moroccan male equestrians
Moroccan dressage riders